The 2022 European U22 Men’s and Women’s Boxing Championships (8th) took place in Poreč, Croatia from 13 to 24 March 2022. Men and women boxers between the ages of 19 and 22 (based on the year of birth – 2000 & 2003) was eligible for this championships. Only one boxer per national federation per weight category would be allowed to compete.

On 4 March 2022 International Boxing Association made the decision to exclude Russian and Belarusian boxers as well as judges and officials from all international competitions. This means that the Russians could not take part in the 2022 European U22 Boxing Championships.

Schedule

Men 
Source:

Women 
Source:

Medalists

Men

Women

Medals tables

Men's

Women's

Participating countries 
Russia and Belarus banned from attending all international competitions due to the 2022 Russian invasion of Ukraine.

Draw Sheets

Men's Minimumweight (46-48 kg)

Men's Flyweight (48-51 kg)

Men's Bantamweight (51-54 kg)

Men's Featherweight (54-57 kg)

Men's Lightweight (57-60 kg)

Men's Light Welterweight (60-63.5 kg)

Men's Welterweight (63.5-67 kg)

Men's Light Middleweight (67-71 kg)

Men's Middleweight (71-75 kg)

Men's Light Heavyweight (75-80 kg)

Men's Cruiserweight (80-86 kg)

Men's Heavyweight (86-92 kg)

Men's Super Heavyweight (92+ kg)

Women's Minimumweight (45-48 kg)

Women's Light Flyweight (48-50 kg)

Women's Flyweight (50-52 kg)

Women's Bantamweight (52-54 kg)

Women's Featherweight (54-57 kg)

Women's Lightweight (57-60 kg)

Women's Light Welterweight (60-63 kg)

Women's Welterweight (63-66 kg)

Women's Light Middleweight (66-70 kg)

Women's Middleweight (70-75 kg)

Women's Light Heavyweight (75-81 kg)

Women's Heavyweight (81+ kg)

References

External links 
 Website
Results Book

European Boxing Championships
European Amateur Boxing Championships
European U22 Boxing Championships
European U22 Boxing Championships
Sports competitions in Poreč
Boxing